Bulbophyllum dusenii is a species of orchid in the genus Bulbophyllum.

References
The Bulbophyllum-Checklist
The Internet Orchid Species Photo Encyclopedia

dusenii
Taxa named by Friedrich Wilhelm Ludwig Kraenzlin